The Great Famine of Mount Lebanon (1915–1918) was a period of mass starvation during World War I that resulted in 200,000 deaths of largely Christian and Druze inhabitants.

Allied forces blockaded the Eastern Mediterranean, as they had done with the German Empire and Austro-Hungarian Empire in Europe, in order to strangle the economy and weaken the Ottoman war effort. The situation was exacerbated by Jamal Pasha, commander of the Fourth Army of the Ottoman Empire, who deliberately barred crops from neighbouring Syria from entering Mount Lebanon, in response to the Allied blockade. Additionally, a swarm of locusts devoured the remaining crops, creating a famine that led to the deaths of half of the population of the Mount Lebanon Mutasarrifate, a semi-autonomous subdivision of the Ottoman Empire and the precursor of modern-day Lebanon.

Other areas in modern-day Lebanon, according to multiple sources, were also famine-stricken. However, due to poor documentation, casualties were never recorded. Some of the areas hit with no documentation include Tyre, Zahle, Akkar and Bint Jbeil.

Background

The Mutasarrifate of Mount Lebanon was created in 1861 as a semi-autonomous subdivision of the Ottoman Empire following the 1860 Lebanon conflict that affronted the Maronite and Melkite Greek Catholic Christians and the Druze of the mountain. Mount Lebanon's economy relied heavily on sericulture; raw silk was processed in looms and finished goods were shipped to the European market.

Causes
The Ottoman alliance with the Central Powers caused the Entente Powers to block international trade routes in order to hinder Ottoman supply ; see . The blockade damaged Mount Lebanon's silk trade, a backbone of the economy. Growing crops was already a challenge in the mountainous region, and the inhabitants relied on food imports from the adjacent Bekaa Valley and Syria. To counter the Allied blockade, the Ottomans adopted a severe policy of acquisition by which all food supplies were prioritized for the army. Jamal Pasha, commander of the Fourth Army of the Ottoman Empire in Syria, barred crops from entering Mount Lebanon. Locust infestations laid waste to the remaining crops. The crisis further exacerbated a black market run by well-connected usurers.

First grain shortages

The Ottoman Empire joined the Central Powers in World War I on 28 October 1914. The Ottoman government had appropriated all of the empire's railway services for military use, which disrupted the procurement of crops to parts of the empire. One of the first cities to be hit by the grain shortage was Beirut.

On 13 November 1914, only 2 weeks after the Ottoman Empire joined the war, a group of citizens stormed the Beirut municipality to warn the municipal council of the severe shortage of wheat and flour in the city. The train freight cars that regularly transported grains from Aleppo had not arrived and the bakery shelves were empty. Angry mobs looted the bakeries of whatever little reserves of flour and grain they had left. The municipal council dispatched a message to then Beirut Vali Bekir Sami Kunduh who requested grain provisions from the governor of Aleppo Vilayet and urged the Ottoman authorities to prioritize grain shipping to Beirut. Acquiring train freight cars to transport anything to the Beirut Vilayet was impossible without paying large bribes to military commanders and to the railroad authorities. Grain prices began to soar, which prompted the president of Beirut's municipal body, Ahmad Mukhtar Beyhum, to address the grain supply bottlenecks himself.

On 14 November 1914, Beyhum took off to Aleppo, where he negotiated with authorities, securing grain freight cars from the Ottoman Fourth Army. The wheat was paid for from the municipal treasury. Grain freights arrived to Beirut on 19 November 1914 to the relief of the masses; however, the crisis was to worsen as both reports of the Ottoman officials and correspondence from the Syrian Protestant College indicated that food shortages were to become a daily occurrence past November.

Impact

Around 200,000 people starved to death at a time when the population of Mount Lebanon was estimated to be 400,000 people. The Mount Lebanon famine caused one of the highest fatality rates by population during World War I, alongside the Armenian Genocide, Assyrian Genocide and Greek Genocide. Bodies were piled in the streets and people were reported to be eating street animals. Some people were said to have resorted to cannibalism.

Soup kitchens were set up but had little effect in relieving the starving population. The Lebanese community in Egypt funded the shipping of food supplies to the Lebanese mainland through Arwad. This assistance was delivered to the Maronite patriarchate who distributed it to the populace through its convents.

The Syrian–Mount Lebanon Relief Committee was "formed in June of 1916 under the chairmanship of Najib Maalouf and the Assistant Chairmanship of Ameen Rihani" in the United States.

Literary references
On 26 May 1916, Gibran Khalil Gibran wrote a letter to Mary Haskell that reads: "The famine in Mount Lebanon has been planned and instigated by the Turkish government. Already 80,000 have succumbed to starvation and thousands are dying every single day. The same process happened with the Christian Armenians and applied to the Christians in Mount Lebanon."  Gibran dedicated a poem named "Dead Are My People" to the fallen of the famine.

Tawfiq Yusuf 'Awwad's landmark full-length novel Al-Raghif (The loaf) is set in the impoverished mountain village of Saqiyat al-Misk during World War I. In the novel, 'Awwad describes scenes from the great famine.

Memorials

The first memorial to memorialize the victims of the famine was erected in Beirut in 2018, marking the 100th year since the end of the famine. The site is called "The Great Famine Memorial", and is located in front of the Saint-Joseph University It was erected based on initiatives by Lebanese historian Christian Taoutel (curator of the memorial) and Lebanese writer Ramzi Toufic Salame.

See also
 Ottoman Empire in World War I
 Aftermath of World War I
 Turnip Winter

References

Bibliography
 Linda Schilcher Schatkowski, «The famine of 1915-1918 in greater Syria», in J. Spagnolo (dir.), Problems of the modern Middle East in historical perspective, Essays in honor of Albert Hourani, Ithaca Press, Reading, 1992, 229–258. 
 Pitts, Graham Auman. “Make Them Hated in All of the Arab Countries: France, Famine, and the Creation of Lebanon.” Environmental Histories of World War I. Richard P. Tucker, Tait Keller, J.R. McNeill, and Martin Schmid, eds. Cambridge, U.K.: Cambridge University Press (2018)

 
Yann Bouyrat, « Une crise alimentaire « provoquée » ? La famine au Liban (1915-1918) », Actes des congrès nationaux des sociétés historiques et scientifiques, vol. 138, no 8,‎ 2016, p. 22–37 https://www.persee.fr/doc/acths_1764-7355_2016_act_138_8_2870

External links
 Tylor Brand: Caesar Affair, in: 1914-1918-online. International Encyclopedia of the First World War.

Famines in Asia
Ottoman Empire in World War I
Ottoman period in Lebanon
1910s in Ottoman Syria
1910s health disasters
Persecution of Christians in the Ottoman Empire
20th-century famines
1910s disasters in Asia
1915 disasters in Asia
1910s disasters in the Ottoman Empire
1915 disasters in the Ottoman Empire